Anaviratty  is a village in Idukki district in the Indian state of Kerala.

Demographics
As of 2011 Census, Anaviratty had a population of 5,050 with 2,555 males and 2,495 females. The average sex ratio was 976 lower than the state average of 1084. In Anaviratty, 10% of the population was under 6 years of age. Anaviratty had an average literacy of 89.1% higher than the national average of 74% and lower than state average of 94%; male literacy was 93.3% and female literacy was 84.9%.

References

Villages in Idukki district